Government Polytechnic Jaunpur, founded in 1984, is a government institute of technical education in Jagdishpur, Jaunpur, Uttar Pradesh, India. It is affiliated with the Uttar Pradesh Board of Technical Education and approved by the All India Council for Technical Education. It falls under the East zone (Varanasi) of UPBTE.

It has an administrative block, a laboratory block, a workshop, an electronics and computer block, and an on-campus hostel building for students.

Degrees offered
Diploma in Pharmacy
Diploma in Electronics Engineering
Diploma in Computer Science & Engineering
Diploma in Mechenical Engineering

History
Government Polytechnic Jaunpur was established in 1984. It began with only one branch, the Diploma in Pharmacy, and an admission capacity of 50 students. The diplomas in Electronics Engineering and Computer Science (and capacity of 75 student) were added later.

References

External links

Technical universities and colleges in Uttar Pradesh
Universities and colleges in Jaunpur district
Educational institutions established in 1984
1984 establishments in Uttar Pradesh